Media Cemetery is a historic cemetery established in 1857 in Upper Providence Township, Pennsylvania. It is located at 40 Kirk Lane and is 21 acres in size. In 1928, the cemetery merged with the adjacent West Media Cemetery and became a non-profit entity.

Notable burials

Jesse Matlack Baker (1854–1913), Pennsylvania State Representative and Senator
Crosby M. Black (1866–1916), Pennsylvania State Representative
Anna Broomall (1847–1931), obstetrician, surgeon and educator
John Martin Broomall (1816–1894), U.S. Congressman
Frank Hastings Griffin (1886–1974), chemical engineer and inventor
Orson Flagg Bullard (1834–1906), Pennsylvania State Representative
Thomas Valentine Cooper (1835–1909), Pennsylvania State Representative and Senator

References

External links
Media Cemetery at Find a Grave
Media Cemetery burials (surnames A-H)
Media Cemetery burials (surnames I-P)
Media Cemetery burials (surnames Q-Z)

1857 establishments in Pennsylvania
Cemeteries established in the 1850s
Cemeteries in Delaware County, Pennsylvania